Paid in Full is the soundtrack album to the 2002 film, Paid in Full. It was released on October 25, 2002, by Roc-A-Fella Records and Def Jam Recordings. The soundtrack was released on two compact discs. The first disc was a collection of old school hip hop and R&B songs, while the second was a collection of new songs recorded by Roc-A-Fella. The album peaked at number 53 on the Billboard 200, number 10 on the Top R&B/Hip-Hop Albums chart and number 2 on the Top Soundtracks chart.

Track listing

Disc 1
"Paid in Full"- 3:46 (Eric B. & Rakim)
"The Show"- 4:26 (Doug E. Fresh and Slick Rick)
"New Generation"- 5:00 (The Classical Two)
"Gangster Shit"- 5:00 (Mob Style)
"The Bridge Is Over"- 4:01 (Boogie Down Productions)
"I Got It Made"- 3:41 (Special Ed)
"Fool's Paradise"- 4:11 (Meli'sa Morgan)  
"Before I Let Go"- 5:01 (Frankie Beverly and Maze)
"In the Air Tonight"- 7:17 (Phil Collins)
"Goodbye Love"- 4:56 (Guy)

Disc 2
"Champions"- 6:12 (Dame Dash, Kanye West, Beanie Sigel, Cam'ron, Young Chris and Twista)
"Roc Army"- 2:57 (Jay-Z, Cam'ron and State Property)
"Bout It Bout It..., Pt. 3"- 5:20 (The Diplomats and Master P)  
"One for Peedi Crakk"- 4:49 (State Property) 
"1, 2 Y'all"- 5:45 (Memphis Bleek, Jay-Z, Lil' Cease and Geda K) 
"Don't You Know"- 3:30 (Jay-Z) 
"You Know What I Want"- 3:40 (Cam'ron)  
"I'm Ready"- 4:44 (The Diplomats) 
"Ghost"- 5:10 (Rick Vocals) 
"Home of Philly"- 4:13 (Young Chris and Beanie Sigel) 
"Alright"- 5:27 (Allen Anthony) 
"City"- 4:01 (M.O.P. and Lil' Red) 
"I Am Dame Dash"- 3:27 (Dame Dash and The Diplomats) 
"Fantasy Real"- 3:16 (Frankie and Freeway)
"On & Poppin'"- 3:30 (Oschino & Sparks)  
"Brooklyn Girl"- 4:01 (M.A.J.)

Charts

Weekly charts

Year-end charts

References

External links

2002 soundtrack albums
Hip hop soundtracks
Albums produced by Just Blaze
Albums produced by Kanye West
Def Jam Recordings soundtracks
Roc-A-Fella Records soundtracks
Albums produced by the Heatmakerz
Drama film soundtracks
Crime film soundtracks